Madonna and Child with an Angel is an oil on canvas painting by Moretto da Brescia, executed c. 1540–1550, now in the Pinacoteca di Brera in Milan, which acquired it in 1911. It had previously been in Gustavo Frizzoni's collection.

References

1540s paintings
Paintings of the Madonna and Child by Moretto da Brescia
Angels in art
Paintings in the collection of the Pinacoteca di Brera